The Mission Creek Oregonian, scientific name Cryptomastix magnidentata, is a species of air-breathing land snail, a terrestrial pulmonate gastropod mollusk in the family Polygyridae.

Distribution
This species is endemic to the United States.

References

Polygyridae
Gastropods described in 1940
Taxonomy articles created by Polbot